The 2012 Solihull Metropolitan Borough Council election took place on 3 May 2012 to elect members of Solihull Metropolitan Borough Council in the West Midlands, England. One third of the council was up for election. The shock result of the election came in Blythe where the Independent Ratepayers ousted a Tory Incumbent. Prior to the election, the defending councillor in Shirley West had joined the Greens, having previously sat as an Independent Liberal Democrat. Following the election another Shirley West Liberal Democrat councillor, Andy Hodgson, joined the Greens, taking their total up to 6 seats, and the Liberal Democrats down to 10.

Election result

This result had the following consequences for the total number of seats on the council after the elections :

Ward results

|- style="background-color:#F6F6F6"
! style="background-color: " |
| colspan="2"   | Independent Ratepayers & Residents gain from Conservatives
| align="right" | Swing
| align="right" | +20.6
|-

References

2012 English local elections
2012
2010s in the West Midlands (county)